Tracy L. Riley (born 1966) is an academic dean and professor of education at Massey University. She specialises in gifted education.

Academic career 
Riley was born in 1966. She was educated at the University of Southern Mississippi, graduating with a MEd in 1990 and PhD in 1995. She took up an academic position at Massey University in New Zealand 1996, rising to full professor effective 1 January 2020.

In 2007 Riley received a New Zealand Award for Sustained Excellence in Tertiary Teaching, in recognition of her pioneering work in eLearning and teaching research. She was presented with the giftEDnz Te Manu Kōtuku Award in April 2017.  

Riley was the first chair of giftEDnz and as of 2020 continues as an elected board member. She has been New Zealand representative on the executive committee of the World Council for Gifted and Talented Children since 2017.

Selected works

Books

Articles

References

External links 

 
 
Gifted Children, keynote speech by Tracy Riley
 
 

1966 births
Living people
University of Southern Mississippi alumni
Academic staff of the Massey University
New Zealand women academics
Academics from Mississippi